Delgocitinib (brand name Corectim) is a pharmaceutical drug for the treatment of autoimmune disorders and hypersensitivity, including inflammatory skin conditions.  Delgocitinib  was developed by Japan Tobacco and approved in Japan for the treatment of atopic dermatitis.  In the United States, delgocitinib is in Phase III clinical trials and the Food and Drug Administration has granted delgocitinib Fast Track designation for topical treatment of adults with moderate to severe chronic hand eczema.

Delgocitinib works by blocking activation of the JAK-STAT signaling pathway which contributes to the pathogenesis of chronic inflammatory skin diseases.

References 

Dermatologic drugs
Non-receptor tyrosine kinase inhibitors
Pyrrolopyrimidines
Spiro compounds
Nitriles
Amides